Pilot Mound is a city in Pilot Mound Township, Boone County, Iowa, United States. The population was 163 at the time of the 2020 census. It is part of the Boone, Iowa Micropolitan Statistical Area, which is a part of the larger Ames-Boone, Iowa Combined Statistical Area.

History
A post office called Pilot Mound has been in operation since 1865. The post office antedates the town's existence. Pilot Mound was laid out as a town in 1881. The community took its name from a prominent summit which affords a clear view of the surrounding area.

Geography
Pilot Mound is located at  (42.162554, -94.014372).

Bluff Creek flows near the town site.

Demographics

2010 census
As of the census of 2010, there were 173 people, 83 households, and 47 families living in the city. The racial makeup of the city was 96.0% White, 2.3% African American, 0.6% Native American, and 1.2% from two or more races.

There were 83 households, of which 20.5% had children under the age of 18 living with them, 47.0% were married couples living together, 3.6% had a female householder with no husband present, 6.0% had a male householder with no wife present, and 43.4% were non-families. 36.1% of all households were made up of individuals, and 18% had someone living alone who was 65 years of age or older. The average household size was 2.08 and the average family size was 2.68.

The median age in the city was 51.9 years. 15% of residents were under the age of 18; 7.4% were between the ages of 18 and 24; 18.6% were from 25 to 44; 34.1% were from 45 to 64; and 24.9% were 65 years of age or older. The gender makeup of the city was 52.6% male and 47.4% female.

2000 census
As of the census of 2000, there were 214 people, 96 households, and 55 families living in the city. The racial makeup of the city was 99.53% White and 0.47% Native American.

There were 96 households, out of which 21.9% had children under the age of 18 living with them, 47.9% were married couples living together, 3.1% had a female householder with no husband present, and 41.7% were non-families. 35.4% of all households were made up of individuals, and 21.9% had someone living alone who was 65 years of age or older. The average household size was 2.23 and the average family size was 2.79.

In the city, the population was spread out, with 20.1% under the age of 18, 6.1% from 18 to 24, 22.9% from 25 to 44, 30.4% from 45 to 64, and 20.6% who were 65 years of age or older. The median age was 46 years. For every 100 females, there were 120.6 males. For every 100 females age 18 and over, there were 98.8 males.

The median income for a household in the city was $29,750, and the median income for a family was $35,313. Males had a median income of $28,125 versus $22,031 for females. The per capita income for the city was $14,414. About 4.9% of families and 8.5% of the population were below the poverty line, including none of those under the age of eighteen and 14.5% of those 65 or over.

Education
Pilot Mound is a part of the Southeast Webster-Grand Community School District, established on July 1, 2005 by the merger of the Grand Community School District and the Southeast Webster Community School District.

References

External links

 
City-Data Comprehensive Statistical Data and more about Pilot Mound

Cities in Boone County, Iowa
Cities in Iowa
1881 establishments in Iowa